State Route 269  (SR 269) is a state highway in the U.S. state of California. It runs in the San Joaquin Valley from State Route 33 in Avenal to State Route 145 in the community of Five Points.

Route description
The southern terminus of SR 269 is at State Route 33 in Avenal, where it drops into the San Joaquin Valley at I-5. In the city of Avenal, it is known as Skyline Boulevard.  From the Fresno-Kings county line, right before I-5 to its northern terminus at SR 145, the road is known as Lassen Avenue and heads due north through Huron.

SR 269 is not part of the National Highway System, a network of highways that are considered essential to the country's economy, defense, and mobility by the Federal Highway Administration.

History
In 1959, Legislative Route number 269 was defined as "from LRN 61 to LRN 23 south of Palmdale." Today, this route is Angeles Forest Highway and Los Angeles County Route N3. The route was defined as a California State route in 1972 as "SR 33 at Avenal to SR 145 near Five Points.”

Major intersections

See also

References

External links

Caltrans: Route 269 highway conditions
California Highways: Route 269
California @ AARoads.com - State Route 269

269
State Route 269
State Route 269